Korea IT Times is a bilingual publication (Korean and English) with an eye on Industry & Technology, including the ICT field based in Seoul, South Korea.

Publication Details:
• Launch: July 2004 
• Publisher: Korea ET Times Media Group 
• Category: ICT, Science news and issues including all of Industry and Technology
• Internet and Mobile online: Daily News

• Print Magazine: Monthly
• Language: English and Korean

Core team
 Chung Monica Younsoo, the founder and publisher of the Korea IT Times, served as the editor of the Korea Economic Daily News.
 Jung Yeon-tae, former CEO of KOSCOM (a Korean provider of financial IT services), was inaugurated as co-publisher and chairman of the Korea IT Times on November 3, 2015.
 Lee Kap-soo, former editor of Korea Times, was inaugurated as an editor in chief of the Korea IT Times on January 10, 2017.

The Korea IT Times editors are Yeon Choul-woong, Jeong Yeon-jin and Chun Clair Go-eun, CMO in New York.
The Korea IT Times staff reporters are Oh Hae-young, Arthur E. Michalak, Yeon Je-hyun, D.Peter Kim, Timothy Daniel, Kim Min-ji, Lee Jun-seong, Jung Se-jin, Kim In-wook, Park Jeong-Jun, Travis Allen, Kim Sung-kap, Ryan Shuster, Natasha Willhite.

 The special advisors are Dr. Yang Seung-taik, former Minister of Information and Communications, Dr. Shin Kook-hwan, the former Minister of Commerce, Industry and Energy, Dr. Kim Hak-su, the former ESCAP Executive Secretary, Dr. Youn Hwa-jin, the former senior economist of ADB, Dr. Kim Wan-soon, professor emeritus, business school of Korea University and Dr. Park Ho-goon, the former Minister of Science and Technology.

Association
The content partners of the Korea IT Times are Google News, Naver News, Euromoney EMIS, Nasdaq Globe Newswire, PR Newswire, Media OutReach and News Republic.

References

 Alexa traffic ranking for Korea IT Times.com: http://www.alexa.com/data/details/traffic_details?url=koreaittimes.com
 Google News index for Korea IT Times.com: https://news.google.com/news?pz=1&ned=us&hl=en&q=site:www.koreaittimes.com&cf=all&scoring=n
 Euromoney (A Euromoney Institutional Investor Company)index for Korea IT Times.com: http://www.securities.com/ch.html?pc=KR
 Naver News index for Korea IT Times.com:https://search.naver.com/search.naver?where=news&sm=tab_jum&ie=utf8&query=%EC%BD%94%EB%A6%AC%EC%95%84%EC%95%84%EC%9D%B4%ED%8B%B0%ED%83%80%EC%9E%84%EC%A6%88

Mass media in Seoul